The Devil's Maze is a 1929 British drama film directed by Gareth Gundrey and starring Renee Clama, Trilby Clark and Ian Fleming. The film was made at the Lime Grove Studios and was released in both sound and silent versions. It was based on the play Some Fools by G.R. Malloch.

Cast
 Renee Clama as Frances Mildmay 
 Trilby Clark as Barbara Carlton 
 Ian Fleming as Derek Riffington 
 Hayford Hobbs as Hon. James Carlton 
 Gerald Rawlinson as Robin Masters 
 Davy Burnaby as Mr. Fry

References

Bibliography
 Cook, Pam (ed.). Gainsborough Pictures. Cassell, 1997.
 Low, Rachael. History of the British Film: Filmmaking in 1930s Britain. George Allen & Unwin, 1985 .

External links

1929 films
1929 drama films
British drama films
Films directed by Gareth Gundrey
British films based on plays
Films shot at Lime Grove Studios
British black-and-white films
1920s English-language films
1920s British films
English-language drama films